The 1997 Women's Cricket World Cup, also known as the Hero Honda Women's World Cup, was the sixth edition of the Women's Cricket World Cup, held in India. With 32 matches between a record 11 teams across 25 cricket grounds, England, Australia, New Zealand and India reached the semi-finals, with Australia and New Zealand progressing to the final match, which was played on 29 December 1997. Australia defeated New Zealand by five wickets to win their fourth championship title.

The 1997 World Cup also set a number of records for the tournament. In their match against Denmark, Australia scored the highest team score in a World Cup, 412/3, and achieved the largest winning margin in a World Cup, 363 runs. In the same match, Australia's Belinda Clark scored 229*, the highest individual score in a World Cup. Australia also bowled out Pakistan for 27 in 82 balls, the shortest completed innings in a Women's One Day International.

Venues

Group stage
The competition began with twenty-five matches between 11 teams, the highest participation of any Women's Cricket World Cup to date. After these matches, Australia, England, the Netherlands, Sri Lanka, India, South Africa, Ireland and New Zealand reached the quarter finals stage, while Denmark, Pakistan and the West Indies were eliminated. The first three matches of this stage were rained off without a ball being bowled, due to torrential storms on 9 and 10 December.

Group A

Table

Fixtures

Group B

Table

Fixtures

Knockout stage

9th-place play-off

Quarter-finals

Semi-finals

India and Australia both qualified for the semi finals, and faced each other on Christmas Eve at Delhi. The start of the match was delayed for two hours and 15 minutes for bad light, and as a result each side was given 32 overs to bat. India won the toss, and captain Pramila Bhatt chose to field first. Australia, put into bat, began well with an opening partnership of 66 between captain Belinda Clark (31) and Joanne Broadbent (33). Bhatt herself broke the partnership, reducing Australia from 66/0 to 83/3 with the wickets of Bhatt, Mel Jones (5) and Michelle Goszko (0), ending with figures of 3/25. A knock of 23 from Karen Rolton and support from Bronwyn Calver (11) saw Australia past 100, however both Olivia Magno and Charmaine Mason were stumped by Anju Jain off the bowling of Neetu David for ducks, and Australia managed 123 from their 32 overs. For slow bowling, two overs were deducted from India's batting innings.

India's reply did not begin as successfully, falling to 24/2 with both Jain and Anjum Chopra out cheaply for 18 and two respectively. Chanderkanta Kaul scored 48, however only two other players reached double figures, and together with Smitha Harikrishna and Renu Margrate (both scoring one) they were all run out. Bhatt hit six runs herself before she was bowled by Cathryn Fitzpatrick, who took 3/18. India's last three players all failed to score, and she fell 19 runs short by the end of her 30 overs on 104/9.

On Boxing Day, England and New Zealand faced each other in the second semi final at Chepauk, in Chennai. New Zealand won the toss, and captain Maia Lewis chose to bat first. New Zealand lost the early wicket of Emily Drumm for four, however they went on to a score of 93 before another wicker fell. Debbie Hockley top scored with 43, and Shelley Fruin (29), Katrina Keenan (35) and 28 extras took New Zealand to 175/6 from their 50 overs. England's bowlers bowled economically, with three going at economy rates of under 2.90, and medium-pacer Karen Smithies took 3/40.

England, set 176 runs from 49 overs, having been fined one over for their own slow over rate, reached 100 for the loss of four wickets, with Charlotte Edwards scoring 25, Jan Brittin 32 and Barbara Daniels 30. Only two other players reached double figures, however, as England slumped from 100/4 to 155 all out from 47.5 overs. Clare Nicholson took 2/29 for New Zealand, with Katrina Keenan, Hockley, Catherine Campbell and Sarah McLauchlan taking one wicked each, and the remaining four England players being run out. This gave New Zealand a 20 run victory, and they progressed to the finals.

Final

The final between Australia and New Zealand took place on 29 December at Eden Gardens in Calcutta, in front of an estimated crowd of at least 50–60,000 spectators. New Zealand won the toss, with captain Maia Lewis choosing to bat first. New Zealand began poorly, losing Emily Drumm, Shelley Fruin and Katrina Keenan for six, eight and five respectively, reaching 49/3. Debbie Hockley, New Zealand's opener, scored 79 (48%) of her team score, as New Zealand eventually reached 164 all out from 49.3 overs. Hockley was one of only three New Zealand players to score in double figures, captain Lewis and wicket-keeper Rebecca Rolls scoring 10 and 18 respectively.

Australia bowled well, Bronwyn Calver, Karen Rolton and Charmaine Mason taking two wickets each, with Cathryn Fitzpatrick taking 1/22 off ten overs, including that of Hockley's wicket. Australia were set 165 runs to win, and began solidly, reaching 107/2 with Belinda Clark reaching 52 before being caught and bowled by Catherine Campbell. Knocks of 37 from Michelle Goszko and Karen Rolton's 24 enabled Australia to reach 165/5 from 47.4 overs, three minutes quicker than the New Zealand innings of 176 minutes. The New Zealand bowlers shared two wickets each between Keenan and Kathryn Ramel, with the former the most economical, taking 2/23 at 2.30 an over, however they could not prevent Australia's victory.

Records and statistics

Batting records

 Highest totals: Australia 412/3.
 Most runs: Debbie Hockley (NZ) 456 runs.
 Highest score: Belinda Clark (Aus) 229*.
 Highest average: Belinda Clark (Aus) 148.33.
 Most hundreds: Debbie Hockley (NZ) Two.
 Most fifties: Debbie Hockley (NZ) Two.
 Most ducks: Thanuga Ekanayake (SL) Three.

Bowlings records
 Most wickets: Katrina Keenan (NZ) 13.
 Best bowling figures in an innings: Purnima Choudhary (IND) 5/21.
 Best averages: Jodi Dannatt (Aus) 7.25.
 Best economy rate: Sangita Dabir (IND) 1.5.
 Best strike rate: Denise Reid (SA) 14.3.
 Most four-wickets-in-an-innings: Suthershini Sivanantham (SL) One.
 Most five-wickets-in-an-innings: Purnima Choudhary (IND) One.
 Best economy rates in an innings: Avril Fahey (AUS) 0.2. (5 overs)
 Best strike rate in an innings: Olivia Magno (AUS) 3.3.
 Most runs conceded in an innings: Susanne Nielsen (DEN) 77 (10 overs).

Wicket-keeping records
 Most dismissals: Jane Smit (ENG) 13.
 Most dismissals in an innings: Jane Smit (ENG) Four.

Fielding records
 Most catches: Nicola Payne (NZ) Six.
 Most catches in an innings: Kathryn Ramel (NZ) Three.

Partnership records
 Highest partnership: Janette Brittin and Barbara Daniels (ENG) 203.

References

Further reading

External links
 Hero Honda Women's World Cup from CricInfo
The Game Changers: An oral history of Australia's 1997 World Cup winners, Part I" , "Part II" and "Part III" – retrospective by the Australian Cricketers' Association (published in 2020)

 
1997 in women's cricket
1997
World Cup 1997
December 1997 sports events in Asia
1997 in Indian cricket
Hero Honda motorcycles
Hero Group